The Women in Film and Television New Zealand Awards, also known as the WIFT NZ Awards, are a set of awards that celebrate and encourage the achievements of New Zealand women in film, television and digital media. The awards are administered by Women in Film and Television New Zealand, the national chapter of Women in Film and Television International, and have been awarded since 2004.

The awards were initially made in four categories; additional categories have been added and as of 2022 the awards are made in 11 categories. The awards were also initially presented annually and are now presented biennially. No awards were made in 2012.

Nominations are invited from the public. A panel selects finalists in each category, who are invited to an awards ceremony in Auckland where the recipients are announced.

Award ceremonies and recipients

2022 

The awards ceremony was held on 8 July at ASB Waterfront Theatre, Auckland. One new category was awarded this year: the Tautai Award for Moana Excellence in the Screen Industry, celebrating the contribution of Moana Pasifika women working in the screen industry in Aotearoa New Zealand.

2020 
The awards ceremony was held on 4 December 2020 at ASB Waterfront Theatre, Auckland, hosted by Antonia Prebble. One new category was awarded this year: the SAE Award for Outstanding Newcomer.

2018 
The awards ceremony was held on 1 March 2018 at ASB Waterfront Theatre, Auckland, hosted by Theresa Healey. Two new categories were awarded for the first time this year: The Queenstown Camera Company Craft Award and The Weta Group Creative Technology Award. The selection panel for the 2018 awards was Christina Milligan (chair), Robin Laing, Vicki Jackways, Cass Avery, Christina Asher, Jill Macnab and Alyx Duncan.

2016 
The awards ceremony was held on 24 February 2016 at the Heritage Hotel, Auckland, hosted by Kate Rodgers.

2014 
The awards ceremony was held on 26 February 2014 at the Heritage Hotel, Auckland. In addition to the seven award categories, an additional special award was made to Patsy Reddy, chair of the New Zealand Film Commission, for her leadership. The selection panel for the 2014 awards was Christina Milligan (chair), Penelope Borland, Sarah Cull, Debra Kelleher, Robin Laing, Fiona Milburn, Teremoana Rapley, and Sue Thompson.

2010 

In addition to the award categories, a special award was presented to Keri Kaa: Te Whaea Whakaata Taonga.

2009

2008 
The awards ceremony was held on 11 August 2008 at Skycity Auckland.

2007

2006

2005 

The awards ceremony was held on 10 October 2005.

2004

See also

 List of awards honoring women

References

New Zealand awards
Awards honoring women
Awards established in 2004
2004 establishments in New Zealand